The East Mediterranean Gas Forum  (EMGF or EGF), also known as the EastMed Gas Forum or simply EastMed, is an international organization formed by Cyprus, Egypt, France, Greece, Israel, Italy, Jordan, and Palestine. Informally established in 2019, the organization's formal charter was signed in September 2020, which an additional framework agreement signed in January 16, and the charter legally entering into force by March 9, 2021. Its headquarters are located in Cairo, Egypt.

History
Originally, the bloc was an informal forum of Egypt, Cyprus, Israel, and Greece. Major companies, such as Total S.A., Eni and Novatek and Exxon, have signed exploration and production agreements concerning gas with those governments.

On September 22, 2020, the member countries signed a formal charter to create a new intergovernmental organization. Subsequently, France asked to join the Forum as a member while the European Union and UAE wish to join as permanent observers. On 9 March 2021, France's membership to the EMGF was approved, while the United Arab Emirate's membership was vetoed by Palestine in the EMGF's Ministerial conference which was held at Cairo, Egypt. The organization also announced on 9 March that its charter had officially entered into effect.

On 15 June 2022 it was announced at the EGMF that the EU, Egypt and Israel had reached an accord that would see the supply of gas to the EU, in order that the latter could reduce its dependence on Russia, which in 2021 supplied the EU with roughly 40 percent of its gas. According to the deal, gas from Israel will be brought via a pipeline to the LNG terminal on the Egypt's Mediterranean coast before being transported on tankers to the European shores. Reports were afoot that Russia cut its exports to Europe on the same day "as a sign of displeasure at the deal signed in Cairo." As a deal sweetener Ursula von der Leyen pledged food relief worth $104 million for Egypt, which has been reeling from grain shortages as a result of the Ukraine war, as well as 3 billion euros in "agriculture, nutrition, water and sanitation programmes over the next years here in the region". The EU's new policy is to be fully independent of Russian fossil fuels before 2030. The subject of the agreement, white gas, is found in underground deposits and created through fracking.

Members & observers
Current members:

 
 
 
 
 
 
 
 

Permanent Observer:

 
 
 World Bank Group

Status Unclear:

  - Observership reportedly vetoed by Palestine in March 2021 despite earlier reports that it had already become an observer in December 2020.

References

See also
Eastern Mediterranean
EastMed pipeline

Eastern Mediterranean
Natural gas
Intergovernmental commodity organizations
Organisations based in Cairo
Foreign relations of the State of Palestine
Foreign relations of Egypt
Foreign relations of Greece
Foreign relations of Israel
Foreign relations of Italy
Foreign relations of Jordan
Organizations established in 2020
2020 establishments in Africa
2020 establishments in Asia
2020 establishments in Europe
2020 establishments in Israel
2020 establishments in Italy